Nordic combined at the 1998 Winter Olympics, consisted of two events, held from 13 February to 20 February. The ski jumping portion took place at Hakuba Ski Jumping Stadium, while the cross-country portion took place at Snow Harp.

Medal summary

Medal table

The Norwegians led the medal table, sweeping the two gold medals. Russia's medal, from Valery Stolyarov was the first, and as of 2010, only medal for Russia in Nordic combined (three Soviet athletes have won Nordic combined medals, two of them from Russia).

Events

Participating NOCs

Fourteen nations participated in Nordic combined at the Nagano Games. Slovenia made their Olympic Nordic combined debut.

References

 
1998 Winter Olympics events
1998
1998 in Nordic combined
Nordic combined competitions in Japan
Men's events at the 1998 Winter Olympics